This is an episode list for Spider-Man and His Amazing Friends, which was an American cartoon series featuring the Marvel Comics superhero Spider-Man.

The first season consisted of 13 episodes, 3 episodes for the second season, and the 8 episodes for the third season.

Series overview

Episodes

Season 1 (1981)

Season 2 (1982) 
This season features the origins of all three Spider-Friends.

Season 3 (1983)

External links 
 

Spider-Man and His Amazing Friends
Episodes
Spider-Man and His Amazing Friends episodes